James Smyth (born 1949) is an Irish former Gaelic footballer who played for the Clan na Gael club and at inter-county level with the Armagh senior football team.

Playing career

Smyth first played Gaelic football as a schoolboy with St Colman's College in Newry. As a member of the college's senor team, he won consecutive MacRory Cup titles as well as a Hogan Cup medal in 1967. Smyth simultaneously enjoyed success at underage level with the Clan na Gael club, winning three Armagh MFC titles. He subsequently progressed to the club's senior team and won nine Armagh SFC titles in a golden age for the club between 1968 and 1981. Smyth also won three successive Ulster SCFC titles and was part of the Clan na Gael team beaten by UCD in the 1974 All-Ireland club final.

Smyth first played for the Armagh senior football team in 1968. He quickly became a constant feature on the team and won a National League Division 3 title in 1976. After being appointed team captain in 1977, Smyth guided the team to a first Ulster SFC title in 24 years. Armagh lost the subsequent All-Ireland final to Dublin, however, he ended the year by being named on the All-Star team. Smyth won a second Ulster SFC title in 1980. His performances at inter-county level also earned inclusion on the Ulster team in the Railway Cup.

Coaching career

In retirement from playing, Smyth became involved in team management and coaching. He won two Armagh SFC titles as Clan na Gael manager, while he also won a number of school underage titles with St Paul's School in Lurgan.

Media career

Smyth was also a commentator for the BBC.

Honours

St. Colman's College
Hogan Cup: 1967
MacRory Cup: 1967, 1968

Clan na Gael
Ulster Senior Club Football Championship: 1972, 1973, 1974
Armagh Senior Football Championship: 1968, 1969, 1971, 1972, 1973, 1974, 1976, 1980, 1981

Armagh
Ulster Senior Football Championship: 1977 (c), 1980

References

1949 births
Living people
Armagh inter-county Gaelic footballers
Clan na Gael CLG Gaelic footballers
Gaelic football managers
Gaelic games writers and broadcasters
Ulster inter-provincial Gaelic footballers